The United Palace (originally Loew's 175th Street Theatre) is a theater at 4140 Broadway in the Washington Heights neighborhood of Manhattan in New York City. The theater, occupying a full city block bounded by Broadway, Wadsworth Avenue, and West 175th and 176th Streets, functions both as a spiritual center and as a nonprofit cultural and performing arts center. Architect Thomas W. Lamb designed the theater as a movie palace, which opened in 1930 as one of five Loew's Wonder Theatres in the New York City area. The theater's lavishly eclectic interior decor was supervised by Harold Rambusch, who also designed the interior of the Roxy Theatre and the Waldorf-Astoria Hotel.

The theater was the first in Washington Heights built specifically to show films, although it also presented live vaudeville. The theater operated continuously until it was closed by Loew's in 1969. That same year it was purchased by the United Christian Evangelistic Association, headed by the television evangelist Rev. Frederick J. Eikerenkoetter II, better known as Reverend Ike. The theater became the headquarters of his United Church Science of Living Institute and was renamed the United Palace.

The building was designated a New York City landmark by the New York City Landmarks Preservation Commission in 2016. As of 2018, the church is called the United Palace of Spiritual Arts, and offers performing arts events through the United Palace of Cultural Arts.  The facility is available for rental to outside event producers and promoters.

Architecture

The architectural style of the terra-cotta-faced theater has been described as "Byzantine-Romanesque-Indo-Hindu-Sino-Moorish-Persian-Eclectic-Rococo-Deco" by David W. Dunlap of the New York Times, who wrote later that Lamb borrowed from "the Alhambra in Spain, the Kailasa rock-cut shrine in India, and the Wat Phra Keo temple in Thailand, adding Buddhas, bodhisattvas, elephants, and honeycomb stonework in an Islamic pattern known as muqarnas." The AIA Guide to New York City calls it "Cambodian neo-Classical" and invites a comparison to Lamb's Loew's Pitkin Theatre in Brownsville, Brooklyn, while New York Times reporter Nathaniel Adams called it simply a "kitchen-sink masterpiece." Lamb himself wrote that "Exotic ornaments, colors and scenes are particularly effective in creating an atmosphere in which the mind is free to frolic and becomes receptive to entertainment."

The interior of the building features a "palatial" staircase. and reflects the western obsession with exotic lands and cultures that was fashionable in the late 19th and early 20th centuries. The interior is decorated with filigreed walls and ceilings, illuminated with indirect, recessed lighting from within and behind the walls. The rich decor is enhanced by reproductions of authentic Louis XV and XVI furnishings.

The theater still looks very much as it did when it first opened; the only major change that Rev. Ike made was adding in the 1970s a cupola or prayer tower on the building's northeast corner, at Wadsworth Avenue and West 176th Street, topped by a "Miracle Star of Faith," visible from the George Washington Bridge and New Jersey.

History

Theater 
Loew's 175th Street Theatre was built as one of the Loew's Wonder Theatres, the company's five extravagant and spacious flagships throughout the New York City area. The other four theaters are Loew's Jersey in Jersey City (1929) and Loew's Kings in Brooklyn (1929), both now used as performing arts centers; and Loew's Paradise in the Bronx (1929) and Loew's Valencia in Queens (1929), both now used as churches.

All five theaters featured identical "Wonder Morton" theatre pipe organs manufactured by the Robert Morton Organ Company of Van Nuys, California. Each organ featured a four-manual console and 23 ranks of pipes. The organ in the United Palace was restored c.1970 after almost 25 years of disuse, and was utilized by the church in its services. It remains in the theater but is not currently functioning due to water damage. Events featuring "Live Organ" accompaniment used an electronic organ. In October 2016 the New York Theater Organ Society began restoration of the organ but its progress was last updated in 2018.
 
Loew's 175th Street Theatre seated over 3,400 people and opened on February 22, 1930. The first program included the MGM film Their Own Desire. starring Norma Shearer, and Pearls, a live musical stage revue starring vaudevillians Shaw and Lee (Al Shaw and Sam Lee). Hollywood stars who appeared at the theatre to host films included Joan Crawford, Judy Garland, Eleanor Powell, and Roy Rogers and Dale Evans. Loew's closed the theater in March 1969, 39 years after it opened, with a showing of 2001: A Space Odyssey.

Church 
In 1969, as the era of grand movie palaces was coming to an end, the theatre was purchased by the United Christian Evangelistic Association, headed by televangelist Rev. Ike, who renamed the building the United Palace. The New York City Landmarks Preservation Commission (LPC) considered designating the theater as a landmark in 1970. However, United Palace objected to the proposal, and the landmark status was not enacted at that time.

The church has since become an all-inclusive, non-denominational spiritual arts community. In 2017, the Eikerenkoetter family "retired from all [United Palace] and [United Palace of Cultural Arts] operations".  As of 2018, the church is named the United Palace of Spiritual Arts.

Classic cinema and live performance venue 
Musical performers since 2007 include Vampire Weekend, Eddie Vedder, Neil Young, Sonic Youth, Bloc Party, Bob Dylan, Wilco, Adele, The Smashing Pumpkins, Beck, Sigur Rós, Jackson Browne, Alex Campos, Björk, Allman Brothers Band, Iggy and the Stooges, Modest Mouse, The Black Crowes, Bryan Ferry, Lenny Kravitz, Mumford & Sons, Bad Bunny, Aventura, Arcade Fire and Kraftwerk.

In 2007, Sir Simon Rattle appeared at the theater conducting the Berlin Philharmonic in Igor Stravinsky's ballet The Rite of Spring danced by public school students and choreographed by Royston Maldoom. The following year, a performance of Leonard Bernstein's Mass was given as part of the celebration of the 90th anniversary of that composer's birth. In addition, recitals, classes and lectures have also been presented at the theatre.

The non-profit United Palace of Cultural Arts (UPCA) was founded by Reverend Ike's son Xavier Eikerenkoetter in 2012 and functions as a community arts center. UPCA currently works to produce performances for youth arts organizations through grants and fundraisers.

In 2013, local benefactor Lin-Manuel Miranda launched successful campaigns to raise money for a new 52-foot screen and digital projection system in the theatre. The monthly film series that followed pairs classic titles with live pre-show entertainment, in an effort to "reinvent going to the movies" as audiences experienced in the golden age of Hollywood. The first film presented in the new format was the 1941 Warner Bros classic Casablanca.

In late 2015, the LPC hosted a public hearing on whether to designate the United Palace as a city landmark. This was part of a review of 95 listings that had been calendared by the LPC for several decades but never approved as city landmarks. The building was designated a New York City landmark on December 13, 2016. The church opposed the landmark designation citing the added cost and time to do any work on the building, use restrictions, and their fifty-year history of preserving the theater entirely with private funds. The church attempted to have the designation overturned but later withdrew their objections. 

On April 7, 2019, the United Palace of Spiritual Arts celebrated its 50th anniversary in the venue with a special screening of the sci-fi classic 2001: A Space Odyssey (the last movie shown at Loew's 175th before it closed as a commercial movie house in 1969).

 Film and TV shoot location 
The United Palace has served as a location in film and television, including the NBC TV series Smash, the Netflix series Luke Cage episode "Blowin' Up the Spot", and the HBO series Crashing episode 2.4 "Porter Got HBO". It was also used in the TV series Pose''.

On December 13, 2022, it was announced that the United Palace would be the venue for the 76th Tony Awards, which is scheduled for June 11, 2023.

Gallery

See also

 List of buildings and structures on Broadway in Manhattan
 List of New York City Designated Landmarks in Manhattan above 110th Street

References

External links

 
 Video profile of the United Palace Theater
 United Place Theater, nocheLatina

Music venues in Manhattan
Cinemas and movie theaters in Manhattan
Movie palaces
Theatres in Manhattan
Churches in Manhattan
Theatres completed in 1930
Washington Heights, Manhattan
Loew's Theatres buildings and structures
Broadway (Manhattan)
Thomas W. Lamb buildings
Public venues with a theatre organ
1930 establishments in New York City